Sunil Das (4 August 1939 – 10 August 2015) was an Indian expressionist painter. He is known for the paintings in his Bull Series and his piece "Woman".

In 2014 the Government of India conferred upon him its fourth-highest civilian award, the Padma Shri.

Early life and background
Sunil Das was born in Calcutta now Kolkata, India.

He joined the Government College of Art & Craft, Kolkata in 1955, then won a French Government Scholarship to study at the École des Beaux-Arts in Paris. He died in 2015.

Career
Das joined Government of India's Handloom division, Ministry of Textiles..

Sunil Das was one of India's most important post-modernist painters. He went through different styles of painting throughout his career. Das said,"To prevent myself from producing the same kind of work, I keep altering my vision. From the day people begun to see me as a painter, a huge responsibility fell upon me, particularly to respond to the feelings of the people at the grassroots level who are also my viewer, as also to delve deep into realities of life around me." At 60 years of age, he could look back at his nine to ten phases of paintings, all of them marked by supreme skill and a sense of integrity. An indefatigable painter, Das jumped from one style to another easily.
He was inspired by the force and the strength of the moving horse and went on to create a work made out of charcoal titled- Horses in Motion. His works revolved around Man-Woman relationships,  Woman in her sexual empowerment and In her loneliness. He had around 88 solo exhibitions across the world including having his work included in the Paris Biennale.

He was the founding member of the Society of Contemporary Artists.

Bull series
 A woman in her failings (oil on canvas)
 Horse series (charcoal)

References

External links
 Profile on Delhi Art Gallery

Indian male painters
1939 births
Indian Expressionist painters
Government College of Art & Craft alumni
University of Calcutta alumni
École des Beaux-Arts alumni
Artists from Kolkata
Recipients of the Padma Shri in arts
2015 deaths
20th-century Indian painters
Painters from West Bengal
20th-century Indian male artists
21st-century Indian male artists